David Charles Bowman (November 15, 1932 – July 10, 2015) was a bishop of the Episcopal Church of the United States. Bowman was the 811th bishop consecrated for the Episcopal Church.

Early life and education
Bowman was born in Oil City, Pennsylvania. He earned a degree from Ohio University in 1955. He served in the United States Army from 1955 to 1957. He then attended Virginia Theological Seminary, graduating with a Masters of Divinity degree in 1960.

Ordination and ministry
In June 1960, Bowman was ordained to the diaconate by Bishop Beverley Tucker. The following December, Bishop Nathan Burroughs of Ohio ordained him to the priesthood. Bowman spent the first part of his ordained ministry as an assistant priest at several Episcopal parishes in Ohio. In 1967 he became rector at St. Andrew's Church in Youngstown. He remained as rector of the parish until 1973. He also served as rector of St. James’ Church, Painesville from 1973 to 1980, and Trinity parish in Toledo as rector from 1980 to 1986.

Bishop
Bowman was elected as coadjutor bishop of the Episcopal Diocese of Western New York in 1986. In 1987, Bishop Harold B. Robinson retired and Bowman automatically became Bishop of Western New York. He remained as bishop of the diocese until retiring in 1998.

After retirement Bowman served as Interim Dean of Trinity Cathedral in Cleveland. He then served an interim bishop in Central New York for one year followed by a year as an assisting bishop of Ohio in 2003. He served as an interim dean and president at the Evanston, Illinois-based Seabury Western Seminary. He served the last ten years of his life as an assisting bishop in Ohio.

Bowman died on July 10, 2015, after a stroke. He was survived by his wife and three children.

References

External links
 Bishop Bowman Dead at 82, obituary in The Living Church

See also
 Episcopal Diocese of Ohio
 Episcopal Diocese of Western New York

1932 births
2015 deaths
People from Oil City, Pennsylvania
Religious leaders from Cleveland
Episcopal bishops of New York
Ohio University alumni
Virginia Theological Seminary alumni
20th-century American Episcopalians
Episcopal bishops of Central New York
Episcopal bishops of Western New York